Lemuel Abbott (ca. 1730 – April 1776) was an English clergyman and poet.

Life
Little is known of his background, but he was a curate in Anstey, Leicestershire, and vicar of Thornton. He is known to posterity primarily for his collection of poems titled Poems on Various Subjects, whereto is Prefixed a Short Essay on the Structure of English Verse, published in 1765. Abbott and his wife Mary were probably the parents of the artist Lemuel Francis Abbott.

References
Richard Allen (1866) Allen's Illustrated Hand-Book and Guide to all the Places of Interest in Nottingham and its Environs, Richard Allen & Son, p. 79
Thompson Cooper, "Abbott, Lemuel (d. 1776)", rev. Michael Bevan, Oxford Dictionary of National Biography, Oxford University Press, 2004 (http://www.oxforddnb.com/view/article/20, accessed 21 March 2007)

1730s births
1776 deaths
18th-century English Anglican priests
People from the Borough of Rugby
English male poets